Syritta luteinervis is a species of syrphid fly in the family Syrphidae.

Distribution
New Guinea.

References

Eristalinae
Diptera of Australasia
Taxa named by Johannes C. H. de Meijere
Insects described in 1908